Ivan Alexandrovich Kovalev (born 26 July 1986) is a Russian professional racing cyclist, with the Russian Helicopters team. His brother Evgeny Kovalev is also a racing cyclist.

Results

 2005
 2004–2005 World Cup
 3rd, Individual Pursuit, Sydney
 2005–2006 World Cup
 1st, Scratch, Moscow
 2006
 2005–2006 World Cup
 2nd, Scratch, Los Angeles
8th Mayor Cup
 2006–2007 World Cup
 1st, Scratch, Moscow
 2nd, Team Pursuit, Moscow (with Alexander Serov, Nikolay Trusov and Ivan Rovny)
 2007
 2006–2007 World Cup
 2nd, Team Pursuit, Manchester (with Alexei Bauer, Evgeny Kovalev and Nikolay Trusov)
2009
1st Stage 4 Five Rings of Moscow
1st Stage 2 Vuelta a Costa Rica
7th Kroz Vojvodina II
2010
1st Prologue Five Rings of Moscow
3rd Mayor Cup
2011
2nd Overall Tour of China
2013
1st Grand Prix of Moscow
1st Intelligentsia Cup Prairie State Cycling Series
2nd European Track Championships – Team Pursuit, Apeldoorn (with Artur Ershov, Evgeny Kovalev and Alexander Serov)
4th Mayor Cup
2014
1st World Scratch Race Championships
1st scratch, UCI Track cycling. Memorial of Alexander Lesnikov, 2.1,  Moscow, Russia
1st madison (Evgeny Kovalev, Ivan Kovalev), UCI Track cycling. Memorial of Alexander Lesnikov, 2.1,  Moscow, Russia

References

External links

 Official site

1986 births
Living people
Sportspeople from Yekaterinburg
Russian male cyclists
Cyclists at the 2012 Summer Olympics
Olympic cyclists of Russia
UCI Track Cycling World Champions (men)
Russian track cyclists